Vexillum jonae is a species of sea snail, a marine gastropod mollusk, in the family Costellariidae, the ribbed miters.

Distribution
This species occurs in Philippines.

References

jonae
Gastropods described in 2017